Aloys Grillmeier  (1 January 1910 – 13 September 1998) was a German Jesuit priest, theologian and cardinal-deacon of the Catholic Church. Pope John Paul II created him cardinal-deacon of San Nicola in Carcere on 26 November 1994.

Life 
Aloys (in German: Alois) Grillmeier was born in Pechbrunn in the Kingdom of Bavaria in 1910 to Joseph Grillmeier and Maria Weidner. He entered the Jesuit Order in April 1929 after completing grammar school in Regensburg. He studied philosophy in Munich and theology in Valkenburg in the Netherlands. He was ordained priest on 24 June 1937 in the middle of further theological studies in Frankfurt am Main. After studying in Rome, he gained his doctorate in February 1942 from the University of Freiburg.

Two days after the graduation ceremony Grillmeier was conscripted into the German army and trained as a medical orderly in Ulm. He was then sent to the Eastern Front where he treated the casualties of the bitter fighting against Soviet forces. He was released from further military service in April 1944 as a member of the Jesuits. Grillmeier then began a long teaching career in fundamental and dogmatic theology, most of which was spent as Professor of Dogmatics at the Sankt Georgen Graduate School of Philosophy and Theology (Frankfurt am Main), where the German Jesuits received their theological education.

Grillmeier became known at the Second Vatican Council, where he acted as theological adviser to Bishop Wilhelm Kempf of Limburg. From 1963 to 1965 he was also on the theology commission of the Council itself. He had a particular input into the drafting of the document Lumen gentium, the Dogmatic Constitution on the Church. It was here that he first met Cardinal Wojtyła and worked with him in writing various works, papers and documents including "Gaudium et spes", "Lumen gentium", "Dei verbum" and "Dignitatis humanae". He retired in 1978 on his 68th birthday, but continued to write and lecture.

Grillmeier died on 13 September 1998 in Unterhaching, Bavaria, Germany.

Legacy 
Grillmeier was committed to ecumenism. In the 1970s he became an adviser to the Pro Oriente Institute in Vienna, which promoted contact with other Christian Churches, especially in the East, and he took part in several unofficial theological dialogues with the Oriental Orthodox Churches and was a member of the official dialogue commission Coptic Orthodox – Roman Catholic.

Bibliography 

Grillmeier's written output – 12 major books and several hundred academic articles – is a part of his legacy. His magnum opus  "Christ in Christian Tradition" looked at the development of Christology from early Christian times to the ninth century, drawing particularly on the traditions of the Eastern Christian Church. Volume one was published in 1965 (with a revised version in 1975) and volume two in 1987. In a rare event, the work was published in English before the original German. Grillmeier published expanded versions of the second volume in the 1990s in collaboration with Theresia Hainthaler.

Books 
 English editions: Christ in Christian Tradition, Volume 1:
 
 
 Volume 2, From the Council of Chalcedon (451) to Gregory the Great (590-604):

References

Sources 
 Obituary on Aloys Grillmeier, in "The Independent" https://www.independent.co.uk/arts-entertainment/obituary-cardinal-alois-grillmeier-1176420.html
 College of Cardinal Collection
 Catholic Hierarchy.com: "Aloys Grillmeier"
 Bibliography of Aloys Grillmeier

1910 births
1998 deaths
People from Tirschenreuth (district)
20th-century German Jesuits
Systematic theologians
20th-century German Catholic theologians
Participants in the Second Vatican Council
Jesuit cardinals
Cardinals created by Pope John Paul II
Burials in Bavaria
German Army personnel of World War II
German male non-fiction writers